The Jewish Publication Society (JPS), originally known as the Jewish Publication Society of America, is the oldest nonprofit, nondenominational publisher of Jewish works in English.  Founded in Philadelphia in 1888, by Reform Rabbi Joseph Krauskopf among others, JPS is especially well known for its English translation of the Hebrew Bible, the JPS Tanakh.

The JPS Bible translation is used in Jewish and Christian seminaries, on hundreds of college campuses, in informal adult study settings, in synagogues, and in Jewish day schools and supplementary programs.  It has been licensed in a wide variety of books as well as in electronic media.

As a nonprofit publisher, JPS develops projects that for-profit publishers will not invest in, significant projects that may take years to complete.  Other core JPS projects include the ongoing JPS Bible commentary series; books on Jewish tradition, holidays and customs, history, theology, ethics and philosophy; midrash and Rabbinics; and its many Bible editions and Bible study resources.

Since 2012, JPS publications have been distributed by the University of Nebraska Press.

History
The first Jewish Publication Society was founded in 1845 in Philadelphia, but was dissolved six years later after a fire destroyed the building and the entire JPS stock. A second, founded in New York in 1873, ended in 1875.

In response to the growing need for English-language Jewish texts, rabbis and lay leaders of the American Jewish community met on June 3, 1888 at a national convention in Philadelphia and founded the Jewish Publication Society.

As JPS moved into the 20th century, membership grew rapidly. After years of meetings, deliberations and revisions, the entire translation of the Bible was finally completed in 1917.  This crowning achievement was put to use at the start of World War I, when young Jewish men were given prayer books and Bible readings as they marched off to war.

As Hitler and the Nazi party rose to power during the 1930s, Jews in America resisted anti-Semitism through the power of words.  Works such as The Decay of Czarism and Legends of the Jews became staples of Jewish literacy and helped to preserve the legacy of European Jewry. JPS also assisted the war effort by supporting refugee employment and resettlement, and by printing pamphlets that were dropped behind enemy lines, at the request of the American government.

During the latter half of the 20th century, JPS published a revised translation of the Bible, books detailing both war atrocities and triumphs, and books with a new-found focus on the State of Israel.  Works such as The JPS Commentary Series, The Jewish Catalog and The K'Tonton Series were tremendously successful. From 1975 to 1978 A. Leo Levin was its President.  In 1985, the newly translated three parts of the Bible (the Torah, Prophets, and Psalms/Writings) were finally compiled into what is now known as the JPS Tanakh (or NJPS, New JPS translation, to distinguish it from the OJPS, or Old JPS translation of 1917).

In September 2011, JPS entered into a new collaborative publishing arrangement with the University of Nebraska Press, under which Nebraska purchased all of JPS's outstanding book inventory, and is responsible for the production, distribution, and marketing of all JPS publications, effective January 1, 2012, while JPS headquarters remained in Philadelphia.

Leadership
JPS is governed by a Board of Trustees, headed by Board President Gittel Hilibrand.

Past editors-in-chief include Henrietta Szold (1893–1916), Solomon Grayzel (1939–1966), and Chaim Potok (1966–1974). Potok was involved in JPS's publication activities for 35 years, serving as editor for 8 years, secretary of the Bible translation committee for the Writings (Ketuvim) for 16 years, chair of the JPS Editorial Committee for 18 years, and literary editor to its Bible program for 18 years.

Dr. Ellen Frankel was editor-in-chief (and later also CEO) from 1991 until October 2009. She is now Editor Emerita of the Society.

Rabbi Barry L. Schwartz became the CEO in 2010, when he came to JPS from Congregation M'Kor Shalom in Cherry Hill, New Jersey, where he had served as senior rabbi for 11 years. Rabbi Schwartz served on the board of several nonprofit organizations, and is especially active in environmental work.

Carol Hupping was managing editor (and for some years publishing director) from 1991 until her retirement in March, 2016. Joy Weinberg succeeded her as managing editor in April 2016.

Notable publications
 The JPS Torah Commentaries (Genesis, Exodus, Leviticus, Numbers, Deuteronomy)
 The JPS Bible Commentaries" (Ecclesiastes, Esther, Haftarot, Jonah, Ruth, Song of Songs)
 Outside the Bible: Ancient Jewish Writings Related to Scripture, Louis H. Feldman, James L. Kugel and Lawrence Schiffman
 The JPS Commentary on the Haggadah", Joseph Tabory
 Dictionary of Jewish Words, Joyce Eisenberg and Ellen Scolnic
 The Jewish Bible, The Jewish Publication Society
 Celebrating the Jewish Year in 3 volumes, Paul Steinberg, Janet Greenstein Potter
 The Commentators' Bible (Exodus, Leviticus, Numbers, Deuteronomy, and Genesis in 2018), Michael Carasik 
 JPS Illustrated Children's Bible, Ellen Frankel
 Chanting the Hebrew Bible, Josh Jacobson
 Jewish Publication Society Series

Audio bible availability
The JPS TANAKH: The Jewish Bible, audio version is a recorded version of the JPS TANAKH, the most widely read English translation of the Hebrew (the Jewish) Bible. Produced and recorded for JPS by The Jewish Braille Institute (JBI), this complete, unabridged audio version features over 60 hours of readings by 13 narrators. It is available for purchase or by subscription from many audio book vendors.

The audio version of the Weekly Torah portion, also known as parsha, was available on the JPS website and will be again soon.

Awards

National Jewish Book Awards (since 2000)
2000:
Synagogues without Jews, Ben-Zion and Rivka
2001:
Forged in Freedom, Norman Finkelstein
The Rebbe’s Daughter, Nehemiah Polen
Etz Hayim, ed. David Lieber
2003: 
To Do the Right and the Good, Elliot Dorff
2006:
Folktales of the Jews: Tales from the Sephardic Dispersion, Dan Ben-Amos
Lilith’s Ark: Teenage Tales of Biblical Women, Deborah Cohen
2007:
Inventing Jewish Ritual, Vanessa Ochs
The Power of Song and Other Sephardic Tales, Rita Roth
2009:
JPS Illustrated Children’s Bible, Ellen Frankel, Illustrated by Avi Katz
Celebrating the Jewish Year: The Spring and Summer Holidays: Passover, the Omer, Shavuot, Tisha B’Av, Paul Steinberg, Janet Greenstein Potter, Editor
Subversive Sequels in the Bible, Judy Klitsner
2011:
The JPS Bible Commentary: Ruth, Tamara Cohn Eskenazi and Tikva Frymer-Kensky
2014:
Outside the Bible: Ancient Jewish Writings Related to Scripture, Louis Feldman, James Kugel, and Lawrence Schiffman

Children's Book Awards
Terrible Things: An Allegory of the Holocaust, Eve Bunting (A Notable Children's Book in the Field of Social Studies)
The Jewish Kids Catalog, Chaya Burstein (National Jewish Book Award)
The Castle on Hester Street, Linda Heller (Parents’ Choice Award)
In the Mouth of the Wolf, Rose Zar (Association of Jewish Librarians Best Book Award)
The Power of Song and Other Sephardic Tales, Rita Roth (National Jewish Book Award)
Anne Frank: A Life in Hiding, Johanna Hurwitz (Nominated for the Texas Blue Bonnet Award: A Notable Children's Trade Book in the Field of Social Studies)
Haym Salomon: Liberty’s Son, Shirley Milgrim (National Jewish Book Award)
Mrs. Moskowitz and the Sabbath Candlesticks, Amy Schwartz (National Jewish Book Award and Association of Jewish Librarians Best Book Award)
Clara’s Story, Clara Isaacman (Sydney Taylor Honor Book)
Lilith’s Ark, Deborah Bodin Cohen (Sydney Taylor Notable Book for Teens)
Of Heroes, Hooks and Heirlooms, Faye Silton (Winner of Sydney Taylor Manuscript Competition)
A Coat for the Moon and Other Jewish Tales, Howard Schwartz (Anne Izard Storytellers' Choice Award and Storytelling World Magazine Award)
David and Max, Gary Provost and Gail Levine-Provost (Notable Children's Book in the Field of Social Studies, Skipping Stones Honor Award)
Potato Pancakes All Around, Marilyn Hirsch (Children's Choice Award)
JPS Illustrated Children’s Bible, Ellen Frankel(National Jewish Book Award and Taylor Book Award Notable Book for Readers of All Ages)
Naomi’s Song, Selma Kritzer Silverberg  (Sydney Taylor Book Award Honor for Books for Teen Readers)
Elvina’s Mirror, Sylvie Weil (Sydney Taylor Book Award Notable Book for Older Readers)

Other  awards
2008:
Skipping Stones Honor Award--A Shout in the Sunshine, Mara Cohen Ioannides
2009:
Sophie Brody Medal--From Krakow to Krypton: Jews and Comic Books, Arie Kaplan
Booklist Editors' Choice: Books for Youth Winner--From Krakow to Krypton: Jews and Comic Books, Arie Kaplan

See also 
 Hebrew Publishing Company

References

External links
 Official website
 
 

Jewish organizations based in the United States
Jewish printing and publishing
Jews and Judaism in Philadelphia
Publishing companies established in 1888
Non-profit publishers
Companies based in Philadelphia
American companies established in 1888
1888 establishments in Pennsylvania